Brides is a music album released in 1987 by English singer Annabel Lamb. Its original release on vinyl contained ten tracks, including a cover of the Velvet Underground's 1970 song, "Sweet Jane". An additional bonus track was added when the compact disc version was released.

Track listing
All songs written by Annabel Lamb, except: track 2 (Leonard Bernstein, Stephen Sondheim, Mark Damron), track 3 (Lamb, Scott Davidson), track 4 (Lamb, Liam Sternberg), track 7 (Lou Reed), track 8 (Dani Ali, Lamb) and track 11 (Elmer Rice, Kurt Weill, Langston Hughes)

References
 Brides at allmusic.com. Retrieved: 2011-06-13.
 Brides at technodisco.net. Retrieved: 2011-06-13.

1987 albums
Annabel Lamb albums
RCA Records albums